Patrick De Groote (born 13 October 1958 in Bruges) is a Belgian politician and is affiliated to the N-VA. He was elected as a member of the Belgian Senate in 2010.

Notes

Living people
Members of the Senate (Belgium)
New Flemish Alliance politicians
1958 births
Politicians from Bruges
21st-century Belgian politicians